Nandom is one of the constituencies represented in the Parliament of Ghana. It elects one Member of Parliament (MP) by the first past the post system of election. Nandom is located in the Lawra District of the  Upper West Region of Ghana.

Members of Parliament

References 

Parliamentary constituencies in the Upper West Region